A Resentful Woman (원녀 - Wonnyeo) is a 1973 South Korean horror film.

Plot
The spirit of Bo-yeong is unable to ascend to the next world due to her unmarried status. The woman's nanny's spirit tries to help Bo-yeong by arranging a soul-marriage with a villager named Jeong. Jeong's father has been unjustly imprisoned by the dishonest village chief who covets the family's fortune. The nanny's spirit helps Jeong to pass the Bar examination, so that he can save his father. By now in love with Jeong, Bo-yeong and her nanny's spirit pass into heaven.

References

Sources

External links
 
 
 A Resentful Woman at daum.net

1973 films
South Korean horror films
1970s Korean-language films
1973 horror films